The Collection is an album series by American hip hop group Bone Thugs-N-Harmony.  Volume One, consisting of hit songs between 1994 and 1998, was released on November 24, 1998, by Ruthless Records. Volume Two was released on November 14, 2000.

"B.N.K" is a remake of a song by Eazy-E entitled "Black Nigga Killa". The original version, with 3 verses by Eazy-E and none by Bone Thugs-n-Harmony, can be found on Ruthless Records Tenth Anniversary: Decade of Game.

Track listing

Reception
"A fine introduction to the harmonious outfit's strangely smooth, yet sweary sound." – Tom Doyle, Q.

DVD Easter egg
In the DVD special features section, go to "Change the World" (extended version) and press the right arrow button; this will take you to six Bone Thugs-n-Harmony commercials.

Charts

Weekly charts

Year-end charts

Certifications

References

Bone Thugs-n-Harmony albums
Compilation album series
1998 compilation albums
2000 compilation albums
2000 video albums
Music video compilation albums
Ruthless Records compilation albums
Albums produced by Jermaine Dupri
Albums produced by L.T. Hutton
Gangsta rap compilation albums